Alexa Pano (born August 20, 2004) is an American professional golfer. She was featured in the 2013 documentary film The Short Game.

Early life
Pano was born in Westborough, Massachusetts, and her parents divorced when she was a baby. She has since lived with her father, Rick, in Lake Worth Beach, Florida. She began playing golf at the age of 5.

At the 2012 U.S. Kids Golf World Championship, then-7-year-old Pano and a group of her fellow competitors, including Allan Kournikova and Sky Sudberry, were filmed for The Short Game. At that point, she was only spending mornings at Citrus Cove Elementary School and taking the remainder of her classes through Florida Virtual School so that she could focus on golf. In the film, she said that she wanted to be the first woman to play in a tournament at Augusta, a feat that she accomplished seven years later when she competed in the inaugural Augusta National Women's Amateur.

Amateur career
Pano was the first three-time national finalist in the Drive, Chip and Putt competition. She is tied for most U.S. Kids Golf World Championships with five in 2011, 2012, 2013, 2015, and 2016.

Pano was the youngest golfer to play a LPGA of Japan Tour event when she played the 2016 Yonex Ladies Open at the age of 11. At 13, Pano played in her first LPGA Tour event, the 2018 Thornberry Creek LPGA Classic. The same year, she represented the United States for a win in the Junior Ryder Cup.

In 2019, she became the youngest player in the inaugural Augusta National Women's Amateur. She also qualified for the U.S. Women's Open, the youngest golfer that year. She played for the winning team in the 2019 Junior Solheim Cup.

Professional career
Pano turned professional in April 2022. She earned status on the Epson Tour by finishing T-10th at Stage II of the 2021 LPGA Qualifying Tournament. She earned her LPGA Tour card for 2023 via Q-School.

Amateur wins
2016 PDQ - Philadelphia Runner Junior
2017 Ione D Jones-Doherty Amateur
2018 Dustin Johnson World Junior Championship, Dixie Amateur
2019 Dustin Johnson World Junior Championship, Scott Robertson Memorial, Rolex Girls Junior Championship, Ione D Jones-Doherty Amateur
2020 Ione D Jones-Doherty Amateur

Source:

U.S. national team appearances
Junior Ryder Cup: 2018 (winners), 2021 (qualified, Cup not played due to COVID-19)
Junior Solheim Cup: 2019 (winners), 2021

References

American female golfers
LPGA Tour golfers
Golfers from Massachusetts
Golfers from Florida
People from Westborough, Massachusetts
People from Lake Worth Beach, Florida
2004 births
Living people
21st-century American women